Denis Kolesnikov (rus. Денис Колесников) - a professional radio host, DJ, translator, voice and founder of  "Kuraj-Bombey”. Man, who dubbed in Russian many award ceremonies and fashion shows.

Biography 

Denis Kolesnikov was born in June 1982 in the far northern town Tynda, later his family moved to Tolyatti . After high school he worked in the design sphere. Since 2000 he worked under the name Mr. Dee.
In 2002, Kolesnikov won the "Show of real Eminems" on MTV in Russia and gets an opportunity to go to the United States, San Francisco, and to hear a live show of Eminem. In 2005 as a head of band "Division Productions" he published a music album in ‘intelligent urban music’ style. In 2006-2009 – worked as a DJ on the radio Next! (Moscow) and "August" (Togliatti). In 2008, he dubbed a Hollywood comedy "How I Met Your Mother" He has a number of translations and editions of books in this series; specifically he translated fully part of the series "Bro Code" and The Playbook. He worked on the short film by Robert Rodriguez, called "Black Mamba", which was published in Russian voiced by «Kuraj-Bombey». In 2008, Dennis began working on comedy series "Everybody Hates Chris", which ended only after 2 years. There were other translations, such as the comedy series "The Big Bang Theory" in 2007 and a lot of work in the comedy "Mike & Molly" in 2010.
In 2011, Denis Kolesnikov worked with the studio "Pythagoras" on translation and dubbing movies "Bad Teacher", "Your Highness", etc.

Now 

In real time Denis Kolesnikov has many things to do: he is a professional radio host, leading many stage shows and works on translation and voicing feature films.
Denis sometimes has to use stealth and "diplomacy" in the translation of texts comedies. As the author admits, to translate literally – is to run into a qualification from critics, that’s why you have to "soften"  a literal translation.

How it all began 

"Mom asked Dennis for something funny and interesting to watch. He offered first series of "The Big Bang Theory".  Mom liked the show, but the continuation of it was only in English. Since his mother did not know the language, she constantly fiddled Dennis: "What 's next?", so he had to translate and voice it for her and for another neighbor - grannie Zinaida. Somehow the translations got into the internet. Denis suspects Zinaida".

Links 

http://kuraj-bambey.ru/about - studio Kuraj-Bambey
http://www.ht.ua/pub/138918.html - Denis Kolesnikov
https://web.archive.org/web/20131214122242/http://imhonet.ru/person/320563/ - Denis Kolesnikov
http://www.kinopoisk.ru/name/2415746/ - Denis Kolesnikov on KinoPoisk

1982 births
Living people
People from Tynda
Russian radio personalities